Molecular Imaging and Biology is published by Springer Science+Business Media as the official journal of the World Molecular Imaging Society (WMIS) in collaboration with the European Society for Molecular Imaging (ESMI). It publishes original research contributions on the utilization of molecular imaging in problems of relevance to biology and medicine.

According to the Journal Citation Reports, the journal has a 2018 impact factor of 3.341.

References

Radiology and medical imaging journals
Bimonthly journals
Springer Science+Business Media academic journals
Publications established in 1999
English-language journals